This is the complete list of Asian Games medalists in football from 1951 to 2018.

Men

Women

References

 RSSSF

External links
Olympic Council of Asia

Football
medalists

Association football player non-biographical articles